Chapqolu (also Romanized as Chapqolū) is a village in Barvanan-e Sharqi Rural District, Torkamanchay District, Mianeh County, East Azerbaijan Province, Iran. At the 2006 census, its population was 79, in 20 families.

References 

Populated places in Meyaneh County